The name Jimena has been used for eight tropical cyclones in the Eastern Pacific Ocean.
 Tropical Storm Jimena (1979) – formed at a very low latitude, remained at sea
 Hurricane Jimena (1985) — remained at sea
 Hurricane Jimena (1991) — remained at sea
 Hurricane Jimena (1997) — formed fairly far east, out in the Pacific Ocean
 Hurricane Jimena (2003) — remained at sea for its entire lifetime. Entered the Central Pacific days after forming, crossed the International Dateline and dissipated there.
 Hurricane Jimena (2009) — tied for strongest hurricane to strike the Baja California Peninsula, also a strong Category 4 hurricane.
 Hurricane Jimena (2015) — a long-lasting, strong Category 4 hurricane.
 Tropical Storm Jimena (2021) – formed in the open ocean

Pacific hurricane set index articles